Jacques Salomé (born 20 May 1935 in Toulouse) is a French psychologist and writer.

Biography
Salomé studied at the École des hautes études en sciences sociales.

He suffered a severe stroke in 2014, which caused him to lose his ability to speak, but he continues to write.

Bibliography

Family relationships 
 En amour, l'avenir vient de loin, Albin Michel, 1996.
 Papa, maman écoutez-moi vraiment, Albin Michel, 1989.
 L'Enfant du possible, avec Nathalie Calmé, Henri Laborit, Jean-Marie Pelt, Bernard This, Albin Michel, 1992.
 C'est comme ça, ne discute pas, Albin Michel, 1996.
 Parle à mon nœud, il a des choses à te dire, Plon, 2001.
 Une vie à se dire, Les Éditions de l'Homme, 2003.
 Heureux qui communique, Albin Michel, 1993, 2003.
 Vivre avec les miens, Les Éditions de l'Homme, 2003.
 Dis papa, l'amour c'est quoi ?, Albin Michel, 2000.

School relationships 
 T'es toi quand tu parles, Albin Michel, 1991.
 Charte de vie relationnelle à l'école, Albin Michel, 1995.
 Mille et un chemins vers l'autre, Éd. Le souffle d'or, 2002.
 Découvrir la communication relationnelle, avec Kathleen Gerlandt, Éd. Jouvence 2003.
 Minuscules aperçus sur la difficulté d'enseigner, Albin Michel, 2004.
 Pour ne plus vivre sur la planète Taire, Albin Michel, 2004.

Professional relationships 
 Formation et supervision de l'éducateur spécialisé, Éd. Privat, 1972.
 Pour ne plus vivre sur la planète Taire, Albin Michel, 1997.
 Oser travailler heureux, Albin Michel, 1999.
 Formation à l'entretien et relation d'aide, Éditions Septentrion (Lille III), 2000.
 Manuel de survie dans le monde du travail, Éd. du Relié, 2010.

Self-relationships 
 Contes à guérir, contes à grandir, illustrations de Dominique de Mestral, Albin Michel, 1993.
 Le Tarot relationnel, Albin Michel, 1995.
 Paroles d'amour, Albin Michel, 1995.
 Communiquer pour vivre, collectif sous la direction de Jacques Salomé, Albin Michel, 1996.
  Tous les matins de l'amour, Albin Michel, 1997.
 Paroles à guérir, Albin Michel, 1999.
 Les Mémoires de l’oubli, Albin Michel, 1999.
 Le Courage d’être soi, Éd. du Relié, 1999.
 Contes à aimer, contes à s'aimer, Albin Michel, 2000.
 Car nous venons tous du pays de notre enfance, Albin Michel, 2000.
 Lettres à l’intime de soi, Albin Michel, 2001.
 Je mourrai avec mes blessures, Éd. Jouvence, 2002.
 Vivre avec soi, Les Éditions de l'Homme, 2003.
 Si je m’écoutais je m’entendrais, Les Éditions de l'Homme, 2003.
 Passeurs de vie, Éd. Dervy, 2003.
 L’enfant Bouddha, Albin Michel, 1993, 2005.
 Et si nous inventions notre vie, Éd. du Relié, 2006.
 Contes d’errance, contes d’espérance, Albin Michel, 2007.
 Pourquoi est-il si difficile d’être heureux, Albin Michel, 2007.
 À qui ferais-je de la peine si j’étais moi-même, Les Éditions de l'Homme, 2008.
 Je viens de toutes mes enfances, Albin Michel, 2009.
 La Ferveur de vivre, Albin Michel, 2012.
 J’ai encore quelques certitudes, Albin Michel, 2015.

 Novels and short stories 
 Je m'appelle toi, Albin Michel, 1990; rééd. 1992.
 Je croyais qu'il suffisait de t'aimer, Albin Michel, 2003.
 N'oublie pas l'éternité, Albin Michel, 2005.
 Collective, Mémoire d'enfances.
 Apprivoiser la tendresse, Éd. Jouvence, 1988.
 Bonjour tendresse, Albin Michel, 1992.
  Au fil de la tendresse, avec Julos Beaucarne, Éd. Ancrage, 2000.
  Inventons la paix, Librio, 2000.
 Je t'appelle tendresse, Albin Michel, 2002.
 Un océan de tendresse, Éd.Dervy, 2002.
 Vivre avec les autres, Les Éditions de l'Homme, 2002.
 Collective, Le Grand Livre de la tendresse, Albin Michel, 2002.
 Paroles de rêves, Albin Michel, 2005.
 Inventer la tendresse, Éd. Bachari, 2005.
 Pensées tendres à respirer au quotidien, Albin Michel, 2006.

 Poems 
 Toi, mon infinitude'', calligraphies de Hassan Massoudy, Albin Michel, 2004.

References

French psychologists
1935 births
Writers from Toulouse
Living people